Naya Elena Tapper (born August 3, 1994) is an American rugby union player. She was selected for the squad to the 2017 Women's Rugby World Cup in Ireland.

Like most of her teammates Tapper began her rugby career while attending her first year of college at the University of North Carolina at Chapel Hill. She majored in Exercise and Sport Science with a minor in Spanish. She was an All-American athlete at West Mecklenburg High School in Charlotte, North Carolina.

Tapper made her rugby sevens debut at the 2016 São Paulo Women's Sevens. In the same year she was selected for the Eagles squad to compete at the Women's Rugby Super Series.

Tapper was among 12 women rugby players selected to represent Team USA at the Tokyo 2020 Olympic Games. She was selected to represent the United States at the 2022 Rugby World Cup Sevens in Cape Town.

References

External links
 Naya Tapper at USA Rugby
 
 
 

1994 births
Living people
American female rugby union players
United States women's international rugby union players
American female rugby sevens players
Pan American Games medalists in rugby sevens
Pan American Games silver medalists for the United States
Rugby sevens players at the 2019 Pan American Games
Medalists at the 2019 Pan American Games
Rugby sevens players at the 2020 Summer Olympics
Olympic rugby sevens players of the United States
21st-century American women